Li Ju (born on January 22, 1976, in Nantong, Jiangsu) is a Chinese table tennis player.

Achievements
1996 Asian Cup - 1st team, 2nd singles
1997 World Championships - 1st team, 2nd doubles (with Wang Nan), 3rd singles
1997 World Cup - 2nd singles
1997 Australian Open - 2nd singles & doubles (with Wang Chen)
1997 China Grand Prix - 1st singles, 3rd doubles (with Wang Nan)
1997 ITTF Pro Tour Grand Finals - 1st singles
1997 National Games - 1st team, 2nd doubles (with Wu Na)
1998 Ericsson China Open Challenge - Chief player to take up the challenges
1998 China All Stars Tournament - 1st doubles (with Wang Nan)
1998 Japan Open - 1st singles & doubles (with Wang Nan)
1998 Asian Championships - 1st singles & team
1998 Bangkok Asian Games - 1st doubles (with Wang Nan) & team, 2nd singles
1999 ITTF Pro Tour Grand Finals - 1st doubles (with Wang Nan)
1999 Ericsson China Open Challenge Finals - 1st singles
1999 Asia-Top 12 - 2nd singles
1999 Eindhoven World Championships - 1st doubles
2000 Kuala Lumpur World Team Championships - 1st team
2000 Sydney Olympic Games - 1st doubles, 2nd singles
2000 Japan Open - 2nd singles
2001 World Championships - 1st doubles & team
2001 World Women's Club Championship - 1st team
2003 World Championships - 1st doubles (with Wang Nan)
2003 China Grand Prix - 1st doubles (with Bai Yang, first title won after her comeback)

References 

 Li Ju at China Daily

1976 births
Living people
Chinese female table tennis players
Olympic gold medalists for China
Olympic table tennis players of China
Sportspeople from Nantong
Table tennis players at the 2000 Summer Olympics
Olympic medalists in table tennis
Asian Games medalists in table tennis
Table tennis players from Jiangsu
Table tennis players at the 1998 Asian Games
Medalists at the 2000 Summer Olympics
Olympic silver medalists for China
Medalists at the 1998 Asian Games
Asian Games gold medalists for China
Asian Games silver medalists for China
Nanjing Sport Institute alumni
20th-century Chinese women
21st-century Chinese women